Elizabeth J. Tasker (born 12 July 1980) is a British astrophysicist, science writer and Associate Professor at the Japan Aerospace Exploration Agency. She wrote The Planet Factory, which was published by Bloomsbury in 2017.

Education 
Tasker studied theoretical physics at Durham University and graduated in 2002. She moved to the University of Oxford for her doctoral studies, working under the supervision of Greg Bryan. She completed her thesis Numerical simulations of the formation and evolution of galaxies in 2005.

Career and research
Tasker joined Columbia University as a postdoctoral research assistant, where she worked on simulations of star formation that incorporated feedback from supernovae. She has investigated whether stellar feedback results in the death of Giant Molecular Clouds. She spent three years at the University of Florida as the Theoretical Astrophysics Postdoctoral Fellow, before moving to McMaster University as a CITA National Fellow in 2009.

Tasker's research investigates how stars form in disc galaxies using computer simulations. She looks at how galaxy structure impacts the formation of stars, and how star formation drives galaxy evolution. She has argued for the need to evaluate the language around exoplanet ranking metrics. She joined Hokkaido University as an international tenure-track academic in 2011. She won the Hokkaido University President’s Award for Education in 2014, 2015 and 2016. She was appointed to JAXA, the Japan Aerospace Exploration Agency, as an associate professor in 2016, working on hydrodynamical models of star and planet formation.

Science communication 
Tasker is also a popular science writer. In 1999 she won The Daily Telegraph Young Science Writers Award. She has written for Scientific American, How It Works, Space.com, The Conversation and Astronomy. She has presented popular science lectures at the Communicating Astronomy with the Public conference, the Royal Institution and American Museum of Natural History. In 2015, Tasker presented How Did We Begin at TEDx Hokkaido University. She has spoken about the work of the Earth-Life Science Institute to the general public.

The Planet Factory 
In 2017 Bloomsbury Publishing released Tasker's first book, The Planet Factory. The book was described as "brilliantly written" by Physics World and "splendidly readable and authoritative" by Caleb Scharf.

References 

British astrophysicists
British women scientists
Women astrophysicists
Women astronomers
Columbia University fellows
Academic staff of Hokkaido University
University of Florida faculty
1980 births
Living people
Alumni of Durham University